Abaddon Incarnate are an Irish deathgrind band.

History
Abaddon Incarnate was formed in Dublin in 1994, playing fast death metal with grindcore elements. Under the name Bereaved the band released two demo cassette tapes, Signs of Death in 1992 and Tortured Souls in 1994. The decision was made to change their name to Abaddon Incarnate on the release of their third demo, When the Demons Come. Since then the band has released two more promos (in 1996 and 2001) and five full-length album releases, namely The Last Supper in 1999, Nadir in 2001, Dark Crusade in 2003 and Cascade in 2009, Pessimist in 2014. Additionally a split 7-inch with U.S. grind band "Phobia" was released in 2011.

The band has toured extensively in Europe including Spain, France, Britain, Switzerland, Germany. In South America they were the first extreme Irish metal band to play in Ecuador, Colombia and Peru. Also they have toured in Russia and Australia.

Abaddon Incarnate are currently signed to Transcending Obscurity Records (UK) but have previously been signed to the Slovakian label Metalage Productions French label Season of Mist, to the Irish label Sentinel Records, and to the Spanish label Xtreem Music.

Original drummer Olan Parkinson rejoined in 2019 after filling in for some Irish dates and now Under Transcending Obscurity the band will release their sixth album The Wretched Sermon in early 2022. In June 2022, the band revaled that the album would be released on August 5.

Current lineup
Stephen "Steve" Maher - guitar, vocals (1994–)
Bill Whelan - guitar, vocals (1994–present)
Olan Parkinson - drums (1994-2002, 2020-)
Irene Siragusa - bass, vocals (2015–)

Past members
Rob Tierney - bass (1994–1999)
Cory Sloan - bass, vocals (1999–2002, 2003–2004)
Jason Connolly - drums (2003–2007)
Steve Finnerty - bass (2007–2015)
Johnny King - drums (2007–2016)
 Karl Leavey - drums (2016- 2019)
Wayne Glass - vocals (2016–2020)

Discography

As Bereaved
 Signs of Death (demo, 1992) with Alan Kelly, Shane Foley 
 Tortured Souls (demo, 1994) with Alan Kelly, Shane Foley

As Abaddon Incarnate
 When the Demons Come (demo, 1995)
 2-track Sampler (demo, 1996)
 The Last Supper LP (Season of Mist, 1999)
 3 Track Sampler 2001 (demo, 2001)
 Nadir LP (Sentinel, 2001)
 Dark Crusade LP (Xtreem Music, 2004)
 Cascade LP (Metal Age, 2009)
 Phobia/Abaddon Incarnate split 7-inch (Underground Movement, 2011)
 Pessimist LP (Candlelight Records, 2014)
 The Wretched Sermon LP (Transcending Obscurity, 2022)

References

External links
 Metalireland.com Interview
 Abaddon Incarnate biography @ MusicMight
 Abaddon Incarnate page @ metalireland.com

Irish death metal musical groups
Musical groups established in 1991
Musical quartets
1991 establishments in Ireland
Season of Mist artists
Candlelight Records artists